Duplantier is a surname. People with the surname include:

Adrian G. Duplantier (1929–2007), United States District Judge 
Armand Duplantier (1753–1827), French cavalry officer in the American Revolutionary War
Joe Duplantier (born 1976), French-American musician
Jon Duplantier (born 1994), American baseball player
Mario Duplantier (born 1981), French-American musician, brother of Joe